Lauren Eve Montgomery (born May 4, 1980) is an American storyboard artist, director, character designer, producer and writer.

Early life
Lauren Montgomery became interested in drawing as a youngster and developed an interest in animation. In 1998 she enrolled in the animation program at Loyola Marymount University's School of Film and Television where she graduated in 2002.

Style 
According to Montgomery, "I was definitely influenced by the Disney films. Those were the drawings I was tracing and sketching during my early years. I would study each and every one of the princesses and draw them until I had them all down by heart. My facial features are still influenced somewhat by Disney characters. As I got older, I was definitely influenced by Bruce's style in Batman (referring to Bruce Timm and Batman: The Animated Series), and I started getting into anime, and some of the more subtle styles in anime drawing. The clothing is a little more detailed than the typical American animation – it's more believable, yet still simplified. It's the way they draw bodies and cloth that I kind of incorporate into my drawings, as well as certain aspects of how they would draw hair. So I'd say I have a few different influences in my art style."

Career
Montgomery got her start on the 2002-2004 animated series He-Man and the Masters of the Universe animated by Mike Young Productions. Montgomery has done storyboards for animated television series' such as Ben 10 from Cartoon Network Studios. She also worked on the Next Avengers: Heroes of Tomorrow and Hulk Vs animated features, based on Marvel Comics properties by Lions Gate Entertainment. Moreover, she worked on the G.I. Joe features for Reel FX Creative Studios and distributed by Paramount Pictures. Montgomery was heavily involved in the animated series Voltron: Legendary Defender, released between 2016 and 2018. She served as executive producer as well as a director on the first four episodes and storyboard artist and writer on others. Her role as executive producer resulted in death threats against her due to the series' final seasons controversy around its LGBT characters. Following the conclusion of Voltron, she worked as a supervising producer on Santiago of the Seas.

DC animation 
In television, Montgomery has done storyboard work for the television series Justice League Unlimited, for which producer Bruce Timm praised her work as being quite versatile. Montgomery made her directorial debut by directing several episodes of the Legion of Super Heroes series.

Montgomery was involved with most DC Universe Animated Original Movies that were released between 2007 and 2013. Her first DC film property was as a storyboard artist for the second DC Universe film production, Justice League: The New Frontier, based on the Eisner Award-winning graphic novel by Darwyn Cooke, DC: The New Frontier. She made her film debut as was one of the three directors for the direct-to-video feature film Superman: Doomsday, directing the second act of the movie. In March, 2008, it was announced that she would be the director for the direct-to-video Wonder Woman film from Warner Premiere. The animated feature was released on March 3, 2009. She continued her directorial film career with the studio, directing Green Lantern: First Flight in 2009, Superman/Batman: Apocalypse in 2010, and co-directing Justice League: Crisis on Two Earths and Batman: Year One alongside Sam Liu.

Avatar: The Last Airbender 

Montgomery provided storyboard work on eight episodes for season 3 of the original animated series Avatar: The Last Airbender, created by Bryan Konietzko and Michael Dante DiMartino. She went on to serve as a supervising producer and storyboard artists on all episodes of the sequel series The Legend of Korra. In 2021, it was announced that Montgomery would direct the first animated movie in the franchise, set to release in 2025, for Paramount Pictures.

Illustration
Montgomery has released a sketchbook with comic book/animation artist Eric Canete entitled Beauty and the Beast published by Black Velvet Studios. She has also done various freelance illustration work such as illustrating a cover for Nickelodeon Magazine and a press release illustration for the Avatar series.

Filmography

References

External links

Artist art site Retrieved 15 December 2008
Interview on Superman:Doomsday Retrieved 15 December 2008
Interview on Wonder Woman Retrieved 15 December 2008
Talking to Lauren Montgomery Retrieved 14 February 2009
Blast Magazine Interview Retrieved 28 February 2009
Superman/Batman: Apocalypse Q&A With Lauren Montgomery Retrieved 4 October 2010

American animators
American animated film directors
American animated film producers
Place of birth missing (living people)
American storyboard artists
DreamWorks Animation people
Living people
1980 births
American women illustrators
American illustrators
Loyola Marymount University alumni
American women animators
21st-century American women